The Associated General Contractors of America (AGC) is a trade association in the United States construction industry, with headquarters in Arlington, Virginia.

History
The AGC was founded in November, 1918 to address problems identified during World War I. In 1912, the federal government asked the U.S. Chamber of Commerce to bring all industry associations together under its umbrella. AGC's founding members attended a Chamber-led meeting in Atlantic City, New Jersey in the spring of 1918, but felt it was geared too much toward subcontractors. In the fall of 1918, the group that would later become the founding members met in Chicago and subsequently formed AGC.

Membership
AGC represents over 6,500 of America’s general contractors, and over 9,000 specialty-contracting firms. More than 10,500 service providers and suppliers are also associated with AGC, through a nationwide network of chapters.

References

External links
 AGC website

Construction organizations
Construction industry of the United States
Organizations established in 1918
1918 establishments in the United States
Organizations based in Arlington County, Virginia